Lucus Feroniae was an ancient sanctuary or, literally sacred grove ("lucus"), dedicated to the Sabine goddess Feronia, protector of freedmen, ex-slaves. It was located near to the ancient town of Feronia in Etruria on the ancient Via Tiberina, in what is now the territory of the modern commune of Capena, Lazio.

It was partially excavated when the A1 Rome-Milan motorway which crosses it was built, and the archaeological site is adjacent to that of the ancient Roman Villa dei Volusii.

The sanctuary was located near the later port on the Tiber, facing the Sabine settlement of Cures nearby. Later the forum was built on its south side.

History

According to tradition it was a Faliscan colony.

In the time of Tullus Hostilius (r.672–640 BC) it was visited both by Latins and Sabines even though it was in Etruria. In the 3rd c. BC, the most famous religious festivities in Italy took place here, with great yearly gatherings of worshippers and excavations have shown that the town expanded considerably in this period.

Due to its rich contents, the sanctuary was plundered by Hannibal in 211 BC. The rebuilt sanctuary was struck by lightning in 196 BC. The town surrounding the sanctuary was developed with rectangular insulae and streets probably through Gnaeus Egnatius, governor of Macedonia and builder of the via Egnatia.

Between 143 and 129 BC the sanctuary was rebuilt in stone as a Hellenistic temple of corinthian order and with porticos surrounding the sacred area. It was later destroyed perhaps in the Social Wars as were many other Italic sanctuaries after 90 BC.

The settlement continued to grow as a market town with the trade done there on religious holidays. As Strabo (writing around 10 AD) says:

In Imperial times the sanctuary became part of the larger town of Feronia under the radical restructuring that the site underwent as Colonia Iulia Felix Lucoferensis after receiving a colony of Octavian's veterans.

The site

Inscriptions show that the sanctuary or lucus of Feronia lay behind the eastern wall of the forum and was accessible through a small portico built in the early Augustan period by the duumvir A. Ottavius.

The sanctuary consisted of the sacred wood (lucus), the temple and a large altar: the temple of an Italic plan has some of the ashlar foundations and parts of the facade with fluted columns, the architrave and the tympanum, all likely to be related to the reconstruction following Hannibal's sack. The altar is aligned with the entrance portico on the Forum; a further entrance seems to be located further north on the via Tiberina. In the 1960-61 excavations, remains of the votive stipa were also found, with anatomical clay material, ceramics, bronzes and jewels.

The wall of the temenos on the northeast was also found, consisting of a sturdy structure in opus incertum with beautiful plaster with imitation marble stucco.

A museum houses many finds from the site.

The Villa dei Volusii is located nearby.

See also
Lucus Pisaurensis

External links
Gladiators Rescued from Tomb Raiders Lie Forgotten under Sheets
Soprintendenza Beni Archeologici Etruria Meridionale Sito Istituzionale > AREE ARCHEOLOGICHE > Villa dei Volusii

References

Roman towns and cities in Italy
Etruscan religion
Roman sites in Lazio
Archaeological sites in Lazio
National museums of Italy